Gusin  is a village in Otwock County, Gmina Sobienie-Jeziory.The  population is near 200. 

From 1975 to 1998 this village was in Siedlce Voivodeship.

Villages in Otwock County